The Robert and Phyllis Scott House is a historic home located at Westminster, Carroll County, Maryland, United States. It is situated atop a ridge on a heavily wooded lot and is a two-story, "butterfly roof", five-bay by two-bay rectangular International Style building set on piers, with several rooms on grade in the center of the house. The house was constructed in 1953–54 to the design of architect Henry Hebbeln of New York.

The Robert and Phyllis Scott House was listed on the National Register of Historic Places in 2003.

References

External links
, including photo from 2003, at Maryland Historical Trust

Houses on the National Register of Historic Places in Maryland
Houses in Carroll County, Maryland
Houses completed in 1954
International style architecture in Maryland
Modernist architecture in Maryland
Westminster, Maryland
National Register of Historic Places in Carroll County, Maryland